Lalita Sahasranama (IAST: lalitāsahasranāma; Sanskrit: ललिता सहस्रनाम) is a sacred Hindu text from the Brahmanda Purana which lists the thousand names of the Hindu mother goddess Lalita Devi, a manifestation of the Divine Mother (Shakti), and is therefore recited in the worship of Devi according to Srikula Sampradayas.

A principal text of Shakti worshipers, it describes the goddess' various attributes in the form of names organized in a hymn. This sahasranama is used in various modes of worship of the Divine Mother such as parayana (recitations), archana, and homa. A different but less popular version of the Lalita Sahasranama can also be found in the purva bhaga of the Narada Purana.

Etymology and names 

Etymologically, Lalita means 'She who plays'. In its root form, the word Lalita means 'spontaneous' which is implicitly extended to 'play'. Her thousand names use occasional wordplay.

The names are organized as hymns, or stotras, but are often broken into mantras to represent all 1000 names. Therefore, the Sahasranama can be chanted in stotra form, or namavali form. The Lalita Saharanama is one of the only sahasranamas that has exactly 1000 names without repetition.

Generally, sahasranamas use the artifice of adding words like tu, api, ca, and hi, which are conjunctions that do not necessarily add to the meaning of the name except in cases of interpretation. The Lalita Sahasranama does not use any such auxiliary conjunctions and is unique in being an enumeration of holy names that meets the metrical, poetical and mystic requirements of a sahasranama by their order throughout the text.

Composition 
Lalita Sahasranama is said to have been composed by the eight vaag devis (Vasini, Kameshvari, Aruna, Vimala, Jayani, Modini, Sarveshvari, and Kaulini) upon the command of the goddess Lalita herself. The text says that "One can worship Lalita only if she wishes us to do so." This stotra occurs in the Brahmanda Purana (history of the universe) in the chapter of discussion between Hayagriva and Sage Agasthya in Kanchipuram. Hayagriva is an incarnation of Vishnu with the head of a horse and is held to be the storehouse of knowledge. Agasthya is one of the sages of yore and one of the stars of the constellation Saptarishi. At the request of Agasthya, Hayagriva is said to have taught him the thousand holiest names of Lalita. The temple at Thirumeyachur, near Kumbakonam, is said to be where Agastya was initiated into this sahasranama. An alternative origin is that the Upanishad Bramham Mutt at Kanchipuram is where this initiation happened.

Structure 
The slokas are organized in such a way that Devi is described from head to feet (kesadhi padham). There are basically five works (pancha krtyam). They are creation (srishti), protection (sthiti), destruction (samharam), hiding (thirudhanam) and blessing (anugraham). Devi herself has been described as "pancha krtya parayana" in the sloka and the five tasks are described as follows:

This means Devi is the aspect of Brahma, while creating sristhi, aspect of Vishnu while sustaining sristhi, aspect of Rudra during dissolution sanghara. These five entities (Brahmma, Vishnu, Rudra, Isvara and Sadasiva) are known as "pancha-brahma". Lalitha has designated the five functions to these brahmam. Sometimes, Devi will take away the life from these five brahmmam and make them inactive, performing all the five tasks herself. At that time, they will be called "pancha pretam" that is lifeless bodies. The first three slokas are: Srimata (great mother) – srshti; Sri Maharajni (great ruler) – sthithi; Srimat Simhasaneswari (one who sits on the lion throne) – samharam. The rest of the slokas cover thirodhanam and anugraham.

The next names – "chidhagnikunda sambhutha devakarya samudhyatha" tells us that devi arose from the fire of knowledge to help devas in their task (war against asuras – bhandasura). From the nama- Udhyath bhanu sahasraba till sinjanamani manjeera manditha sree padambuja, all her parts like her face, forehead, eyes, mouth, tongue, voice, hands and legs have been described.Thereafter, Devi's place (Chintamani gruham), her war against bandasura, kundalini shakti, and her properties have been described. A common image of the goddess depicts a parrot and a sugarcane with her. Sugarcane represents the sweetness of her mind.

Commentaries
There are five known commentaries on the root text. These were written by:
 Vimarśãnanadanãtha, about 2,000 granthas (a verse containing 32 letters);
 Vidyāraņya Munīśvara, about 1,500 granthas;
 Bhațța Nãrãyaṇa, about 2,500 granthas;
 Śaṃkara, mundane and not considered of much importance;
 Bhāskararāya, references the previous commentaries, esp. the first.

Key concepts

Dhyana 
The start of the Lalita Sahasranama is characterized by the Dhyana, which are descriptive verses for visualization. There are four dhyana verses. It describes the yogi (the person reciting the Sahasranama) as meditating upon the form of Lalita and describes many of the qualities of the goddess. The Dhyana is said before chanting the thousand names.

The first verse starts with "sinduraruna-vigraham" and is most likely the verse composed by the eight Vaag Devis. The second verse beginning with "arunam karuna-tarangatakshim" is said to have been composed by Dattatreya. The fourth, beginning with "sakumkuma-vilepanam", was probably composed by Adi Sankaracharya. No known information is available on the origins of the third verse beginning with "dhyayet padmasanastham". In all the dhyana verses there is a recurring theme on Devi's red complexion, which is said to resemble the sun at dawn, and her compassionate nature.

Lalita 
The Lalita Sahasranama is organized in such a way that Devi is described from "Head to Toe" (Kesadi Padam). The names then go on to extoll Devi in all her achievements, powers, and forms.

Physical description 
The Lalita Sahasranama goes into great detail describing the physical aspect of the goddess. The beginning of the Sahasranama describes Lalita in her female form, Kameshvari, along with her consort, Kameshvara. Kameshvari is described as extremely beautiful, having dark thick long hair adorned with champaka, ashoka, punnaga and saugandha flowers (13), having a musk tilak on her forehead (16), and having eyebrows which appear as if they are the arch gates of Kamadeva's abode (17). The next few mantras continue describing Lalita Devi as the ideal feminine form whose splendor is unmatched by any other celestial: with cheeks that shine like a mirror of Padmaraga (23), having beautiful white teeth resembling the shodasakshari mantra (25), and having a voice sweeter than the sound emanating from Kachchapi, the veena of Saraswati. The last mantra describing Devi's physical appearance is the 46th name, "sinjana mani majira mandita sripadambuja" (whose feet are adorned with musical anklets filled with gem stones).

Kameshvara and Kameshvari 
The next few names then continue to focus on the union between Lalita as Kameshvari, and Kameshwara. Devi is described as having a beautiful smile (28), beautiful breasts (33), and perfect thighs (39) which steal the heart of Kameshvara; she wears a mangal sutra and necklaces (30), with succeeding names describing the lower half of Devi's body to her feet. This divine couple continues to stay united throughout the Sahasranama; the penultimate name is "sivasakti aikya rupini" (who is the unification of Siva and Shakti). As per Hindu philosophy, it is understood that there is nothing beyond this union of Siva and Shakti, or the Absolute form, except the true goddess Lalita herself. This is why the last name of the Sahasranama is "Lalitambika" effectively showing that Devi's form as Lalitambika is her most absolute form.

The City of Sri Nagara

Origins 
At the behest of name 57, the divine city of Sri Nagara is described in all its splendor. The origins of the city can be traced to two different texts. One is in Durvasa's Lalithastavaratna, saying that Sri Nagara was constructed by celestial architect Visvakarma. The other, in the Rudra Yamala (as told to Parvati by Shiva), says that Sri Nagara is in the midst of an ocean of milk as an island called Ratnadvipa (island formed out of precious gems). This description fits name 61, "sudha sagara madhyasta," which describes Devi as residing in the middle of the ocean of nectar.

Description 
Sri Nagara is surrounded by twenty five walls, each wall representing a tattva. Sri Nagara has 25 streets circling it, made of elements, gems, and precious stones. In the eighth street is a forest of kadambas presided by Mantrini (Matangi) (60). On the fifteenth street resides the eight directional guardian deities. In the sixteenth resides Varahi(alias Dandini or Dandanatha) who was Lalita's commander in chief in her battle with Bhandasura. In the seventeenth street resides the different Yoginis. In the eighteenth street resides Maha Vishnu. In the nineteenth street resides Esana, in the twentieth resides Tara Devi, in twenty first resides Varuni, in the twenty second resides Kurukulla who presides over the fort of pride, in twenty third resides Marthanda Bhairava, in twenty fourth resides the moon, and in the twenty fifth resides Manmatha presiding over the forest of love.

In the center of Sri Nagara is the Maha Padma Atavi (59), the forest of the Great Lotuses, and within it the Chintamani Griha (57), a palace constructed out of Cintamani, the wish fulfilling gem.  The palace is said to be on the northern side of Sri Nagara; to its north east is the Chid-agni kunda and on both sides of its eastern gate are the houses of Mantrini and Dandini. On its four gates stand the Chaduramnaya gods for watch and ward.

The Sri Chakra and Lalita herself are said to reside within the Chintamani Griha. The chakra is said to be made up of the following components, all represented in its decorative features: the square representing Trilokya Mohanam (Devi as the most beautiful in the three worlds), the sixteen petaled lotus called the Sarvasa paripoorakam (Devi as the fulfiller of all desires), the eight petaled lotus called the Sarvasamksopanam (Devi as the cleanser), the sixteen cornered figure representing Sarva Saubhagyam (luck), the external ten cornered figure called the Sarvartha Sadhakam (Devi as the giver of all assets), the internal ten cornered figure called Sarva Raksha Karam (Devi as the protector), the eight cornered figure called the Sarva Roga Haram (Devi as the cure to all diseases), the triangle called the Sarva Siddhi Pradam (Devi as the giver of all powers), and the central dot known as the Sarvananda Mayam or the Bindu (Devi as pleasure). In the center of the Chakra, on the throne of the Pancha Brahmas (58) on the Bindu Peeta (380) sits Maha Tripura Sundari.

Bhandasura 
One of the main events extolled in the Lalita Sahasranama is Devi's battle with the asura Bhandasura. According to the story, the devas prayed to Devi to kill Bhandasura. As she started for war, the Sahasranama describes her as being accompanied by the powers of various shaktis and devis whose accomplishments are extolled in different names. Names in the Sahasranama describes Sampatkari Devi as the captain of the elephant regiment (66) and Aswarooda Devi as the captain of the cavalry (67). Lalita as Para Shakti herself is described as riding in the Sri Chakra Chariot (chakraraja or the king of chariots) in name 68. After descriptions of the battle with respects to the various shaktis, Lalita is described as decimating Bhandasura's army using the Paashupathastra weapon (81), and destroying him and his city with the Kameshvarastra weapon (82). After praises from the devas (83), she is said to have then gave life back to Manmatha (Kamadeva) for the good of the world (84).

The Five Works of God and the Trimurti 
In the Lalitha Sahasranama, Devi herself has been described as "pancha krtya parayana" (274). This is in reference to the five works of God (pancha krtyam): creation (srishti), protection (sthiti), destruction (samharam), hiding (tirodhanam) and blessing (anugraham). The mantras preceding name 274 describe Devi in reference to the Hindu trinity:

Devi is therefore described as an aspect of Brahma while creating (srishti), an aspect of Govinda (Vishnu) while sustaining (sthiti), an aspect of Rudra (Shiva) during dissolution (samhara), an aspect of Ishvara while concealing (thirodana), and an aspect of Sadashiva while blessing (liberating). These five entities (Brahma, Vishnu, Rudra, Isvara and Sadashiva) are known as "pancha-brahma" and "pancha-preta." The goddess is described as "pancha-brahma swarupini" (she whose form is composed of the five Brahmas) in name 250. Such mantras are interpreted by many Shakti-ite scholars to show that Devi's power is at par with, if not superior, to the powers of the trimurti. This idea is furthered by other mantras like "Om panca preta manchadi sayinyai namah" (who reclines on a couch made of the Five Corpses) in mantra 947; this most likely references the concept of the five Brahmas as lifeless bodies when Devi performs all the five tasks, mentioned previously, herself.

The Yoginis 
The first 60 names from 475 to 534 discuss the seven chakras of kundalini and sahasrara. Each chakra is presided over by a deity called a yogini (with seven in total). Lalita herself is described as being present in the form of the kundalini energy (the divine feminine energy at the muladhara chakra at the bottom of the spine). Since the kundalini energy has to transcend the other chakras to reach the sahasrara chakra (a representation of Siva or the divine masculine energy) from the muladhara chakra, worshipping the respective yoginis of each chakra is paramount. Each of these yoginis have their own mantras describing their complexion, armories, qualities, and sacred foods within the Lalita Sahasranama as a whole.

See also
 Devi Mahatmya
 Lakshmi

References

Works cited

Further reading

External links

 Word by word - Śrī Lalitā Sahasranāma Stotra Mālā in IAST script.

Sahasranama
Shaktism